Walquir Mota (born August 18, 1967 in Patos de Minas, Brazil) is a former professional footballer who played as a striker.

External links
Walquir Mota profile at chamoisfc79.fr

1967 births
Living people
Brazilian footballers
Brazilian expatriate footballers
Association football forwards
FC Mulhouse players
AS Beauvais Oise players
Tours FC players
Lille OSC players
Chamois Niortais F.C. players
Paris FC players
Ligue 1 players
Ligue 2 players
Expatriate footballers in France